Laura Petronella Aarts (born 10 August 1996) is a Dutch water polo player for Dunaújvárosi FVE and the Dutch national team.

She won the gold medal at the 2018 Women's European Water Polo Championship.

She won the Women's LEN Trophy in 2018 playing for Dunaújváros.

She was one of the sport ambassadors for EuroGames 2022 in Nijmegen.

See also
 List of World Aquatics Championships medalists in water polo

References

External links
 

1996 births
Living people
Dutch female water polo players
Expatriate water polo players
Dutch expatriates in Hungary
World Aquatics Championships medalists in water polo
20th-century Dutch women
20th-century Dutch people
21st-century Dutch women